Pecos River is a 1951 American Western film directed by Fred F. Sears and starring Charles Starrett, Jock Mahoney and Anne James. The film's sets were designed by the art director Charles Clague.

Plot

Cast
 Charles Starrett as Steve Baldwin / The Durango Kid 
 Jock Mahoney as Jack Mahoney
 Anne James as Betty Coulter 
 Steve Darrell as Pop Rockland 
 Edgar Dearing as Henry Mahoney 
 Frank Jenks as Sheriff Denning 
 Harmonica Bill as Harmonica Player Bill 
 Smiley Burnette as Smiley Burnette

References

Bibliography
 Pitts, Michael R. Western Movies: A Guide to 5,105 Feature Films. McFarland, 2012.

External links
 

1951 films
1951 Western (genre) films
American Western (genre) films
Films directed by Fred F. Sears
Columbia Pictures films
American black-and-white films
1950s English-language films
1950s American films